Symphonia nymphulalis is a moth in the family Crambidae. It was described by Hubert Marion and Pierre Viette in 1956 and is found on Madagascar.

References

Acentropinae
Moths described in 1956